Blue Hill is a mountain in Sullivan County, New York. It is located west-southwest of Claryville. Denman Mountain is located east-southeast of Blue Hill.

References

Mountains of Sullivan County, New York
Mountains of New York (state)